is the assistant coach of the San-en NeoPhoenix in the Japanese B.League.

Career statistics 

|-
| align="left" | 2008-09
| align="left" | Hamamatsu
| 8 || || 2.1|| .400 || .333 || .000 || 0.5 || 0.1|| 0.5 || 0.0 ||  0.6
|-

Head coaching record

|-
| style="text-align:left;"|Sendai 89ers
| style="text-align:left;"|2013-14
| 52||24||28|||| style="text-align:center;"|8th in Eastern|||-||-||-||
| style="text-align:center;"|-
|-
| style="text-align:left;"|Sendai 89ers
| style="text-align:left;"|2014-15
| 52||37||15|||| style="text-align:center;"|3rd in Eastern|||2||0||2||
| style="text-align:center;"|Lost in 1st round
|-
| style="text-align:left;"|Sendai 89ers
| style="text-align:left;"|2015-16
| 52||37||15|||| style="text-align:center;"|2nd in Eastern|||4||2||2||
| style="text-align:center;"|Lost in 2nd round
|-
| style="text-align:left;"|San-en NeoPhoenix
| style="text-align:left;"|2019-20
| 41||5||36|||| style="text-align:center;"|6th in Central|||-||-||-||
| style="text-align:center;"|-
|-

References

1985 births
Living people

Japanese basketball coaches

San-en NeoPhoenix coaches
San-en NeoPhoenix players
Sendai 89ers coaches